Geastrum corollinum is an inedible species of mushroom belonging to the genus Geastrum, or earthstar fungi. First described scientifically by German naturalist August Johann Georg Karl Batsch in 1792 as Lycoperdon corollinum, it was transferred to the genus Geastrum by László Hollós in 1904.

References

corollinum
Fungi of Europe
Inedible fungi
Taxa named by August Batsch
Fungi described in 1792